State University of Makassar is a public university in Makassar, South Sulawesi, Indonesia. It was established on 1 August 1961. Its rector is Husain Syam.

History
Founded on August 1, 1961, until August 31, 1964, the status of Teacher Training and Education Faculty of Hasanuddin University, based on Ministerial Decree No. PTIP. 30, 1964 Date of August 1, 1961. on 1 September 1964 until January 1965 the status of Yogyakarta branch Makassar Teachers' Training College, based on Ministerial Decree No. PTIP. 154 of 1965 Date 1 September 1965. as well as at 5 January to August 3, 1999, with the name of the independent status of Makassar Teachers' Training College, by decree of the President of the Republic Indonesia No.272 of 1965 dated January 5, 1965. In this phase, since 1 April 1972, Teachers 'Training College Teachers' Training College Makassar changed to Ujung Pandang by following a name change Makassar Municipal Municipal Ujung Pandang. and on August 4, 1999, to the present status of university by the name of Makassar State University (UNM) based on the Decree of President of the Republic Indonesia No. 93 of 1999 dated August 4, 1999. Until mid-2011, the number of D3 9 Prodi Prodi as much as 58 S1, S2 Prodi Prodi as many as 12 and as many as 5 S3.

Chancellor
 Prof. Arnold Mononoetoe (1961)
 Prof. Idrak Yasin. MA (1965)
 Mayjen A.A Rivai (1965)
 Prof. Edy Agussalim Mokodompit. MA (1965 - 1974)
 Drs Abdul Karim (1974 -1982)
 Prof. Dr. Paturungi Parawansa (1982 - 1990)
 Prof. Dr. Syahruddin Kaseng (1990 - 1999)
 Prof. Dr. M. Idris Arief. MS (1999 - 2007)
 Prof. Dr. Arismunandar. M.Pd (2008–2016)
 Prof. Dr. H. Husain Syam, M.TP. (2016–present)

Faculty
The University has 9 faculties:
 Faculty of Social Sciences
 Faculty of Languages and Literature
 Faculty of Art and Design
 Faculty of Sport Science
 Faculty of Psychology
 Faculty of Economics
 Faculty of Mathematic and Natural Sciences
 Faculty of Engineering
 Faculty of Education Science

External links

 Official site

Universities in Indonesia
Educational institutions established in 1961
1961 establishments in Indonesia
Universities in South Sulawesi
Indonesian state universities